Lavarus Lakeith Giles (born February 15, 1986 in Benoit, Mississippi) is a professional American and Canadian football running back who is currently a free agent. He most recently played for the Saskatchewan Roughriders. He was signed by the Jacksonville Jaguars as an undrafted free agent in 2008. He played college football at Jackson State.

Giles has also been a member of the St. Louis Rams, Calgary Stampeders, New Orleans Saints and Winnipeg Blue Bombers.

Early years
Giles ran track at Ray Brooks High School, finishing 1st in the state in the 100 meter dash and 2nd in the 200-meter dash. He also played basketball where he led his team to a state championship.

External links
Jackson State Tigers bio
Jacksonville Jaguars bio
St. Louis Rams bio

1986 births
Living people
People from Benoit, Mississippi
American football running backs
American players of Canadian football
Canadian football running backs
Jackson State Tigers football players
Jacksonville Jaguars players
St. Louis Rams players
Calgary Stampeders players
New Orleans Saints players
Winnipeg Blue Bombers players
Saskatchewan Roughriders players